Mary of Teck (Victoria Mary Augusta Louise Olga Pauline Claudine Agnes; 26 May 186724 March 1953) was Queen of the United Kingdom and the British Dominions, and Empress of India, from 6 May 1910 until 20 January 1936 as the wife of King-Emperor George V.

Born and raised in the United Kingdom, Mary was the daughter of Francis, Duke of Teck, a German nobleman, and Princess Mary Adelaide of Cambridge, a granddaughter of King George III and a minor member of the British royal family. She was informally known as "May", after the month of her birth.

At the age of 24, she was betrothed to her second cousin once removed Prince Albert Victor, Duke of Clarence and Avondale, the eldest son of the Prince of Wales and second in line to the throne. Six weeks after the announcement of the engagement, he died unexpectedly during an influenza pandemic. The following year, she became engaged to Albert Victor's only surviving brother, George, who subsequently became king. Before her husband's accession, she was successively Duchess of York, Duchess of Cornwall, and Princess of Wales.

As queen consort from 1910, Mary supported her husband through the First World War, his ill health, and major political changes arising from the aftermath of the war. After George's death in 1936, she became queen mother when her eldest son, Edward VIII, ascended the throne. To her dismay, he abdicated later the same year in order to marry twice-divorced American socialite Wallis Simpson. She supported her second son, George VI, until his death in 1952. She died the following year, during the reign of her granddaughter Elizabeth II, who had not yet been crowned. An ocean liner, a battlecruiser, and a university were named in her honour.

Early life

Princess Victoria Mary of Teck was born on 26 May 1867 at Kensington Palace, London, in the room where Queen Victoria, her first cousin once removed, had been born 48 years and two days earlier. Queen Victoria came to visit the baby, writing that she was "a very fine one, with pretty little features and a quantity of hair".

Her father was Prince Francis, Duke of Teck, the son of Duke Alexander of Württemberg by his morganatic wife, Countess Claudine Rhédey von Kis-Rhéde. Her mother was Princess Mary Adelaide of Cambridge, a granddaughter of King George III and the third child and younger daughter of Prince Adolphus, Duke of Cambridge.

She was baptised in the Chapel Royal of Kensington Palace on 27 July 1867 by Charles Thomas Longley, Archbishop of Canterbury. From an early age, she was known to her family, friends and the public by the diminutive name of "May", after her birth month.

May's upbringing was "merry but fairly strict". She was the eldest of four children and the only daughter.  She "learned to exercise her native discretion, firmness, and tact" by resolving her three younger brothers' petty boyhood squabbles. They played with their cousins, the children of the Prince of Wales, who were similar in age. She grew up at Kensington Palace and White Lodge, in Richmond Park, which was granted by Queen Victoria on permanent loan. She was educated at home by her mother and governess (as were her brothers until they were sent to boarding schools). The Duchess of Teck spent an unusually long time with her children for a lady of her time and class, and enlisted May in various charitable endeavours, which included visiting the tenements of the poor.

Although May was a great-grandchild of George III, she was only a minor member of the British royal family. Her father, the Duke of Teck, had no inheritance or wealth and carried the lower royal style of Serene Highness because his parents' marriage was morganatic. The Duchess of Teck was granted a parliamentary annuity of £5,000 and received about £4,000 a year from her mother, the Duchess of Cambridge, but she donated lavishly to dozens of charities. Prince Francis was deeply in debt and moved his family abroad with a small staff in 1883, in order to economise. They travelled throughout Europe, visiting their various relations. For a time they stayed in Florence, Italy, where May enjoyed visiting the art galleries, churches and museums. She was fluent in English, German, and French.

In 1885, the family returned to London and lived for some time in Chester Square. May was close to her mother and acted as an unofficial secretary, helping to organise parties and social events. She was also close to her aunt, the Grand Duchess of Mecklenburg-Strelitz, and wrote to her every week. During the First World War, the Crown Princess of Sweden helped pass letters from May to her aunt, who lived in enemy territory in Germany until her death in 1916.

Engagements

In 1886, "May" (as she was known) was a debutante in her first season, and was introduced at court. Her status as the only unmarried British princess who was not descended from Queen Victoria made her a suitable candidate for the royal family's most eligible bachelor, Prince Albert Victor, Duke of Clarence and Avondale, her second cousin once removed and the eldest son of the Prince of Wales.

On 3 December 1891 at Luton Hoo, then the country residence of Danish Ambassador Christian Frederick de Falbe, Albert Victor proposed marriage to May and she accepted. The choice of May as bride for the Duke owed much to Queen Victoria's fondness for her, as well as to her strong character and sense of duty. However, Albert Victor died six weeks later, in a recurrence of the worldwide 1889–90 influenza pandemic.

Albert Victor's brother, Prince George, Duke of York, now second in line to the throne, evidently became close to May during their shared period of mourning, and Queen Victoria still thought of her as a suitable candidate to marry a future king. The public was also anxious that the Duke of York should marry and settle the succession. In May 1893, George proposed, and May accepted. They were soon deeply in love, and their marriage was a success. George wrote to May every day they were apart and, unlike his father, never took a mistress.

Duchess of York (1893–1901) 

Mary married Prince George, Duke of York, in London on 6 July 1893 at the Chapel Royal, St James's Palace. The new Duke and Duchess of York lived in York Cottage on the Sandringham Estate in Norfolk, and in apartments in St James's Palace. York Cottage was a modest house for royalty, but it was a favourite of George, who liked a relatively simple life. They had six children: Edward, Albert, Mary, Henry, George, and John.

The children were put into the care of a nanny, as was usual in upper-class families at the time. The first nanny was dismissed for insolence and the second for abusing the children. This second woman, anxious to suggest that the children preferred her to anyone else, would pinch Edward and Albert whenever they were about to be presented to their parents so that they would start crying and be speedily returned to her. On discovery, she was replaced by her effective and much-loved assistant, Charlotte Bill.

Sometimes, Mary and George appear to have been distant parents. At first, they failed to notice the nanny's abuse of the young princes Edward and Albert, and their youngest son, Prince John, was housed in a private farm on the Sandringham Estate, in Bill's care, perhaps to hide his epilepsy from the public. Despite Mary's austere public image and her strait-laced private life, she was a caring mother and comforted her children when they suffered from her husband's strict discipline.

Edward wrote fondly of his mother in his memoirs: "Her soft voice, her cultivated mind, the cosy room overflowing with personal treasures were all inseparable ingredients of the happiness associated with this last hour of a child's day ... Such was my mother's pride in her children that everything that happened to each one was of the utmost importance to her. With the birth of each new child, Mama started an album in which she painstakingly recorded each progressive stage of our childhood". He expressed a less charitable view, however, in private letters to his wife after his mother's death: "My sadness was mixed with incredulity that any mother could have been so hard and cruel towards her eldest son for so many years and yet so demanding at the end without relenting a scrap. I'm afraid the fluids in her veins have always been as icy cold as they are now in death."

As Duke and Duchess of York, George and Mary carried out a variety of public duties. In 1897, she became the patron of the London Needlework Guild in succession to her mother. The guild, initially established as The London Guild in 1882, was renamed several times and was named after Mary between 1914 and 2010. Samples of her own embroidery range from chair seats to tea cosies.

On 22 January 1901, Queen Victoria died, and Mary's father-in-law ascended the throne as Edward VII. For most of the rest of that year, George and Mary were known as the "Duke and Duchess of Cornwall and York". For eight months they toured the British Empire, visiting Gibraltar, Malta, Egypt, Ceylon, Singapore, Australia, New Zealand, Mauritius, South Africa and Canada. No royal had undertaken such an ambitious tour before. She broke down in tears at the thought of leaving her children, who were to be left in the care of their grandparents, for such a long time.

Princess of Wales (1901–1910) 
On 9 November 1901, nine days after arriving back in Britain and on the King's sixtieth birthday, George was created Prince of Wales. The family moved their London residence from St James's Palace to Marlborough House. As Princess of Wales, Mary accompanied her husband on trips to Austria-Hungary and Württemberg in 1904. The following year, she gave birth to her last child, John. It was a difficult labour, and although she recovered quickly, her newborn son developed respiratory problems.

From October 1905 the Prince and Princess of Wales undertook another eight-month tour, this time of India, and the children were once again left in the care of their grandparents. They passed through Egypt both ways and on the way back stopped in Greece. The tour was almost immediately followed by a trip to Spain for the wedding of King Alfonso XIII to Victoria Eugenie of Battenberg, at which the bride and groom narrowly avoided assassination. Only a week after returning to Britain, Mary and George went to Norway for the coronation of George's brother-in-law and sister, King Haakon VII and Queen Maud.

Queen and empress consort (1910–1936) 

On 6 May 1910, Edward VII died. Mary's husband ascended the throne and she became queen consort. When her husband asked her to drop one of her two official names, Victoria Mary, she chose to be called Mary, preferring not to be known by the same style as her husband's grandmother, Queen Victoria. She was the first British queen consort born in Britain since Catherine Parr. Mary was crowned alongside her husband at a coronation on 22 June 1911 in Westminster Abbey. Later in the year, the new King and Queen travelled to India for the Delhi Durbar held on 12 December 1911, and toured the sub-continent as Emperor and Empress of India, returning to Britain in February.

The beginning of Mary's period as consort brought her into conflict with her mother-in-law, Queen Alexandra. Although the two were on friendly terms, Alexandra could be stubborn; she demanded precedence over Mary at the funeral of Edward VII, was slow in leaving Buckingham Palace, and kept some of the royal jewels that should have been passed to the new queen.

During the First World War, Queen Mary instituted an austerity drive at the palace, where she rationed food, and visited wounded and dying servicemen in hospital, which caused her great emotional strain. After three years of war against Germany, and with anti-German feeling in Britain running high, the Russian Imperial Family, which had been deposed by a revolutionary government, was refused asylum. News of the tsar's abdication provided a boost to those in Britain who wished to replace their own monarchy with a republic. The war ended in 1918 with the defeat of Germany and the abdication and exile of the kaiser.

Two months after the end of the war, Queen Mary's youngest son, John, died at the age of thirteen. She described her shock and sorrow in her diary and letters, extracts of which were published after her death: "our poor darling little Johnnie had passed away suddenly ... The first break in the family circle is hard to bear but people have been so kind & sympathetic & this has helped us [the King and me] much."

Her staunch support of her husband continued during the later half of his reign. She advised him on speeches and used her extensive knowledge of history and royalty to advise him on matters affecting his position. He appreciated her discretion, intelligence, and judgement. She maintained an air of self-assured calm throughout all her public engagements in the years after the war, a period marked by civil unrest over social conditions, Irish independence, and Indian nationalism.

In the late 1920s, George V became increasingly ill with lung problems, exacerbated by his heavy smoking. Queen Mary paid particular attention to his care. During his illness in 1928, one of his doctors, Sir Farquhar Buzzard, was asked who had saved the King's life. He replied, "The Queen". In 1935, King George V and Queen Mary celebrated their silver jubilee, with celebrations taking place throughout the British Empire. In his jubilee speech, George paid public tribute to his wife, having told his speechwriter, "Put that paragraph at the very end. I cannot trust myself to speak of the Queen when I think of all I owe her."

Queen mother (1936–1952) 
George V died on 20 January 1936, after his physician, Lord Dawson of Penn, gave him an injection of morphine and cocaine that may have hastened his death. Queen Mary's eldest son ascended the throne as Edward VIII. She was then to be known as Her Majesty Queen Mary.

Within the year, Edward's intention to marry his twice-divorced American mistress, Wallis Simpson, led to his abdication. Mary disapproved of divorce, which was against the teaching of the Anglican church, and thought Simpson wholly unsuitable to be the wife of a king. After receiving advice from the Prime Minister of the United Kingdom, Stanley Baldwin, as well as the Dominion governments, that he could not remain king and marry Simpson, Edward abdicated.

Though loyal and supportive of her son, Mary could not comprehend why Edward would neglect his royal duties in favour of his personal feelings. Simpson had been presented formally to both King George V and Queen Mary at court, but Mary later refused to meet her either in public or privately. She saw it as her duty to provide moral support for her second son, the reserved Prince Albert, Duke of York. Albert ascended the throne on Edward's abdication, taking the name George VI. When Mary attended the coronation, she became the first British dowager queen to do so. Edward's abdication did not lessen her love for him, but she never wavered in her disapproval of his actions.

Mary took an interest in the upbringing of her granddaughters, Princesses Elizabeth and Margaret, and took them on various excursions in London, to art galleries and museums. (The princesses' own parents thought it unnecessary for them to be burdened with a demanding educational regime.) In May 1939, Mary was in a car crash: her car was overturned but she escaped with minor injuries and bruises.

During the Second World War, George VI wished his mother to be evacuated from London. Although she was reluctant, she decided to live at Badminton House, Gloucestershire, with her niece, Mary Somerset, Duchess of Beaufort, the daughter of her brother Adolphus. Her personal belongings were transported from London in seventy pieces of luggage. Her household, which comprised fifty-five servants, occupied most of the house, except for the Duke and Duchess's private suites, until after the war. The only people to complain about the arrangements were the royal servants, who found the house too small, though Queen Mary annoyed her niece by having the ancient ivy torn from the walls as she considered it unattractive and a hazard. 

From Badminton, in support of the war effort, she visited troops and factories and directed the gathering of scrap materials. She was known to offer lifts to soldiers she spotted on the roads. In 1942, her youngest surviving son, Prince George, Duke of Kent, was killed in an air crash while on active service. Mary finally returned to Marlborough House in June 1945, after the war in Europe had resulted in the defeat of Nazi Germany.

Mary was an eager collector of objects and pictures with a royal connection. She paid above-market estimates when purchasing jewels from the estate of Dowager Empress Marie of Russia and paid almost three times the estimate when buying the family's Cambridge Emeralds from Lady Kilmorey, the mistress of her late brother Prince Francis. In 1924, the famous architect Sir Edwin Lutyens created Queen Mary's Dolls' House for her collection of miniature pieces. She has sometimes been criticised for her aggressive acquisition of objets d'art for the Royal Collection. On several occasions, she would express to hosts, or others, that she admired something they had in their possession, in the expectation that the owner would be willing to donate it. 

Her extensive knowledge of, and research into, the Royal Collection helped in identifying artefacts and artwork that had gone astray over the years. The royal family had lent out many pieces over previous generations. Once she had identified unreturned items through old inventories, she would write to the holders, requesting that they be returned. In addition to being an avid collector, Mary also commissioned many gifts of jewellery, including rings which she presented to her ladies-in-waiting on the occasion of their engagements.

Death 

In 1952, George VI died, the third of Queen Mary's children to predecease her; her eldest granddaughter, Princess Elizabeth, ascended the throne as Queen Elizabeth II. The death of a third child profoundly affected her. Mary remarked to Princess Marie Louise: "I have lost three sons through death, but I have never been privileged to be there to say a last farewell to them."

Mary died on 24 March 1953 in her sleep at the age of 85, ten weeks before her granddaughter's coronation. She had let it be known that should she die, the coronation should not be postponed. Her remains lay in state at Westminster Hall, where large numbers of mourners filed past her coffin. She is buried beside her husband in the nave of St George's Chapel, Windsor Castle.

Mary's will was sealed in London after her death. Her estate was valued at £406,407 (or £7.9 million in 2022 when adjusted for inflation).

Legacy
Actresses who have portrayed Queen Mary include Dame Flora Robson (in A King's Story, 1965), Dame Wendy Hiller (on the London stage in Crown Matrimonial, 1972), Greer Garson (in the television production of Crown Matrimonial, 1974), Judy Loe (in Edward the Seventh, 1975), Dame Peggy Ashcroft (in Edward & Mrs. Simpson, 1978), Phyllis Calvert (in The Woman He Loved, 1988), Gaye Brown (in All the King's Men, 1999), Miranda Richardson (in The Lost Prince, 2003), Margaret Tyzack (in Wallis & Edward, 2005), Claire Bloom (in The King's Speech, 2010), Judy Parfitt (in W.E., 2011), Valerie Dane (in the television version of Downton Abbey, 2013), Dame Eileen Atkins (in Bertie and Elizabeth, 2002 and The Crown, 2016), Geraldine James (in the film version of Downton Abbey, 2019), and Candida Benson (in The Crown, 2022).

Many places and buildings have been named in her honour, including Queen Mary University of London, Queen Mary Reservoir in Surrey, and Queen Mary College in Lahore.

Sir Henry "Chips" Channon wrote that she was "above politics ... magnificent, humorous, worldly, in fact nearly sublime, though cold and hard. But what a grand Queen."

Honours

Arms
Queen Mary's arms were the royal coat of arms of the United Kingdom impaled with her family arms – the arms of her grandfather, Prince Adolphus, Duke of Cambridge, in the 1st and 4th quarters, and the arms of her father, Prince Francis, Duke of Teck, in the 2nd and 3rd quarters. The shield is surmounted by the imperial crown, and supported by the crowned lion of England and "a stag Proper" as in the arms of Württemberg.

Issue

Ancestry

See also
 Crown of Queen Mary
 Household of George V and Mary
 King George and Queen Mary, BBC documentary
 List of covers of Time magazine (1920s), (1930s)

Notes

References

External links

 Queen Mary at the official website of the Royal Collection Trust
 
 

|-

 
1867 births
1953 deaths
19th-century British people
20th-century British people
19th-century British women
20th-century British women
British debutantes
British queens consort
Queen mothers
Indian empresses
Princesses of Wales
Wives of British princes
Duchesses of York
Duchesses of Rothesay
House of Windsor
Companions of the Order of the Crown of India
Dames Grand Cross of the Order of St John
Dames Grand Cross of the Order of the British Empire
Dames Grand Cross of the Royal Victorian Order
Double dames
British people of German descent
German princesses
Teck-Cambridge family
Knights Grand Commander of the Order of the Star of India
Ladies of the Garter
Ladies of the Royal Order of Victoria and Albert
Members of the Royal Red Cross
People associated with Queen Mary University of London
Queen's Own Rifles of Canada
Burials at St George's Chapel, Windsor Castle
Dames of the Order of Saint Isabel
Grand Cordons of the Order of the Precious Crown
Residents of White Lodge, Richmond Park
Duchesses of Cornwall
People from Kensington